Nick Etwell (born 30 May 1974) is the lead member and trumpeter of The Filthy Six, a British Jazz group.

He is originally from Derby, and was Ben Lovett's music teacher, and has also appeared with Mumford and Sons.

Career
Along with drummer Chris Maas, fiddle player Tom Hobden, and trombone player Dave Williamson, he was part of the touring band for Mumford & Sons, on their mid-2015, 11-date tour of the US.

References

Living people
British jazz musicians
British jazz trumpeters
Male trumpeters
1974 births
21st-century trumpeters
21st-century British male musicians
British male jazz musicians